Notylia punctata is a species of orchid that occurs from Trinidad,  northern Venezuela, and the State of Pará in Brazil.

References

External links 

punctata
Orchids of Brazil
Orchids of Venezuela
Orchids of Trinidad
Flora of Pará
Plants described in 1823